Hoplonomia westwoodi, sometimes known as Nomia (Hoplonomia) westwoodi, is a species of bee in the genus Hoplonomia, of the family Halictidae.

References
 http://www.discoverlife.org/mp/20q?search=Nomia+westwoodi&guide=Nomia&flags=subgenus:
 https://www.academia.edu/7390502/AN_UPDATED_CHECKLIST_OF_BEES_OF_SRI_LANKA_WITH_NEW_RECORDS
 http://www.cea.lk/web/images/pdf/redlist2012.pdf
 http://www.hindawi.com/journals/psyche/2012/231638/

Notes

Halictidae
Hymenoptera of Asia
Insects of Sri Lanka